Tristesse hivernale (English: "Wintry Sadness") is a demo and release debut of French band Alcest, released in 2001 on Drakkar Productions. It is their only release with guitarist Aegnor and bass guitarist Argoth, both from Peste Noire (in which Aegnor later changed his alias to Famine), as the band's creator, Neige, would continue Alcest as a one-man project after the release. It remains the band's only release as a trio.

Unlike the following albums which would be influenced by shoegazing and post-metal, Tristesse hivernale is oriented towards traditional black metal with a raw sound and harsh vocals. It was later re-released by Northern Silence Productions in August 2007 as a split release with another French black metal band, Angmar, under the name Aux funérailles du monde... / Tristesse hivernale.

Track listing

Personnel
 Neige – lead and backing vocals, guitars, keyboards, drums
 Aegnor – lead guitar
 Argoth – bass

References

Alcest albums
2001 albums
Demo albums